Stretton-under-Fosse is a village and civil parish in the English county of Warwickshire. In 2001 its population was recorded as 185, increasing to 234 at the 2011 Census. The village contains a number of old cottages along its main street. Just outside Stretton is an old manor house, Newbold Revel, which is currently used as a training college for prison officers. Nearby is the Oxford Canal and a canal arm leading to Stretton Wharf. Stretton means "settlement on a Roman road" (from the Old English stræt and tun). In this case the road is Fosse Way.

Historic buildings
There are 13 listed buildings by Historic England. These include several houses in Main Street, a cast iron canal bridge and the early Victorian church of St. Peter.

References

Sources

 Allen, Geoff, (2000) Warwickshire Towns & Villages,

External links

Villages in Warwickshire
Civil parishes in Warwickshire